The Medellín Cartel was a powerful and highly organized Colombian drug cartel and terrorist organization originating in the city of Medellín, Colombia that was founded and led by Pablo Escobar. It is often considered the first major "drug cartel" and was referred to as such (a cartel) due to the organization's upper echelons being built on a partnership between multiple Colombian traffickers operating alongside Escobar. Included were Jorge Luis Ochoa Vásquez, Juan David Ochoa Vásquez, José Gonzalo Rodríguez Gacha and Carlos Lehder. The cartel operated from 1967 to 1993 in Americas, Europe, Asia, Africa and Oceania. Although the organization started out as a smuggling network in the late 1960s, it wasn't until 1975 that the organization turned to trafficking cocaine. At the height of its operations, the Medellín Cartel smuggled multiple tons of cocaine each week into countries around the world and brought in up to US$60 million daily in drug profits.

Although notorious for once dominating the illegal cocaine trade, the organization, particularly in its later years was also noted for its use of violence for political aims and its asymmetric war against the Colombian government, primarily in the form of bombings, kidnappings, indiscriminate murder of law enforcement and political assassination. At its height, the Medellín Cartel was the largest drug cartel in the world and smuggled three times as much cocaine as their main competitor, the Cali Cartel, an international drug-trafficking organization based in the Valle del Cauca department of Colombia. Traditionally, Pablo and the Medellín Cartel had an arrangement with the Cali Cartel that resulted in Medellín controlling the cocaine trade in Miami, Cali controlling New York City, while both of them agreed to share Los Angeles and Houston. At this time, the Medellín Cartel was generating over $22 billion annually.

History

Late 1970searly 1980s
In the late 1970s, the illegal cocaine trade became a significant problem for law enforcement and became a major source of profit for criminals, particularly smugglers. Drug lord Pablo Escobar provided protection to other smugglers who partnered with him and distributed cocaine for the cartel in New York City and later Miami, establishing a crime network that, at its height, trafficked around 300 kilos per day. During the cartel's zenith, Escobar oversaw the import of large shipments of coca paste from Andean nations such as Peru and Bolivia into Colombia, where it was then processed into cocaine hydrochloride (powdered cocaine) in jungle labs before being flown into the United States in amounts of up to 15 tons per day.

In 1973, there was a military coup in Chile which led to a strong crack down on Chilean drug traffickers. This caused drug traffickers to have to use different routes; namely, a route now ran through the heart of Colombia. Around the same time, the prevalence and social acceptance of contraband in Colombia was at an all-time high. 

By 1982, cocaine surpassed coffee as the chief Colombian export. Around this time in the early 1980s, kidnappings made by guerrilla groups led the State to collaborate with criminal groups like those formed by Escobar and the Ochoas. The abduction of Carlos Lehder as well as the 1981 kidnapping of the sister of the Ochoas led to the creation of cartel-funded private armies that were created to fight off guerrillas who were trying to either redistribute their lands to local peasants, kidnap them, or extort the gramaje money that the Revolutionary Armed Forces of Colombia (Fuerzas Armadas Revolucionarias de Colombia or FARC) attempted to steal.

“Death to Kidnappers”
At the end of 1981 and the beginning of 1982, members of the Medellín Cartel, Cali Cartel, the Colombian military, the U.S.-based corporation Texas Petroleum, the Colombian legislature, small industrialists, and wealthy cattle ranchers came together in a series of meetings in Puerto Boyacá and formed a paramilitary organization known as Muerte a Secuestradores ("Death to Kidnappers", MAS) to defend their economic interests, and to provide protection for local elites from kidnappings and extortion. By 1983, Colombian internal affairs had registered 240 political killings by MAS death squads, mostly community leaders, elected officials, and farmers.

The following year, the Asociación Campesina de Ganaderos y Agricultores del Magdalena Medio ("Association of Middle Magdalena Ranchers and Farmers", ACDEGAM) was created to handle both the logistics and the public relations of the organization, and to provide a legal front for various paramilitary groups. ACDEGAM worked to promote anti-labor policies, and threatened anyone involved with organizing for labor or peasants' rights. The threats were backed up by the MAS, which would attack or assassinate anyone who was suspected of being a "subversive". ACDEGAM also built schools whose stated purpose was the creation of a "patriotic and anti-Communist" educational environment, and built roads, bridges, and health clinics. Paramilitary recruiting, weapons storage, communications, propaganda, and medical services were all run out of ACDEGAM headquarters.

By the mid-1980s, ACDEGAM and MAS had undergone significant growth. In 1985, Pablo Escobar began funneling large amounts of cash into the organization to pay for equipment, training, and weaponry. Money for social projects was cut off and redirected towards strengthening the MAS. Modern battle rifles, such as the AKM, FN FAL, Galil, and HK G3, were purchased from the military, INDUMIL, and drug-funded private sales. The organization had computers and ran a communications center that worked in coordination with the state telecommunications office. They had 30 pilots, and an assortment of fixed-wing aircraft and helicopters. British, Israeli, and U.S. military instructors were hired to teach at paramilitary training centers.

Middlelate 1980s
Following this time in the mid-80s, Escobar's hold on Medellín further increased when he founded a criminal debt collection service known as the “Oficina de Envigado.” This was an office in the town hall of Envigado, a small municipality next to Medellín where Escobar grew up. Escobar used the municipal office to collect debts owed to him by drug traffickers and set the “sicarios” or hired killers on those who refused. Escobar was known to flaunt his wealth and went on to make Forbes' Billionaires list for seven years straight, between 1987 and 1993. His luxurious multimillion-dollar “Hacienda Nápoles" estate had its own zoo, and he reportedly ate from solid gold dinner sets. Escobar was known for investing profits from the drug trade in luxury goods, property, and works of art. He is also reported to have stashed his cash in “hidden coves,” allegedly burying it on his farms and under floors in many of his houses.

Political relations
During the later years of the Cold War, the number of left-wing guerrillas spread in Latin America skyrocketed. The conflicts between them and the right-wing paramilitaries groups and dictatorships, mostly backed by CIA, made the Cartel's search for new allies while it was forced to be involved in corruption outside Colombia for political protection.

Relations with the Colombian government
Once U.S. authorities were made aware of "questionable activities", the group was put under Federal Drug Task Force surveillance. Evidence was gathered, compiled, and presented to a grand jury, resulting in indictments, arrests, and prison sentences for those convicted in the United States. However, very few Colombian cartel leaders were actually taken into custody as a result of these operations. Mostly, non-Colombians conspiring with the cartel were the "fruits" of these indictments in the United States.

Most Colombians targeted, as well as those named in such indictments, lived and stayed in Colombia, or fled before indictments were unsealed. However, by 1993 most, if not all, cartel fugitives had been either imprisoned, or located and shot dead, by the Colombian National Police trained and assisted by specialized military units and the CIA.

The last of Escobar's lieutenants to be assassinated was Juan Diego Arcila Henao, who had been released from a Colombian prison in 2002 and hidden in Venezuela to avoid the vengeance of "Los Pepes". However he was shot and killed in his Jeep Cherokee as he exited the parking area of his home in Cumaná, Venezuela, in April 2007.

While it is broadly believed that Los Pepes have been instrumental in the assassination of the cartel's members over the last 21 years, it is still in dispute whether the mantle is just a screen designed to deflect political repercussions from both the Colombian and United States governments' involvement in these assassinations.

Relations with the CIA

The Kerry Committee report had reached the conclusion that the CIA provided the political protection for the Contras to smuggle cocaine into the US, as the money from these operations was employed in the fight against the Sandinista government. Also the same report made public that Juan Matta-Ballesteros, the link between the Medellin Cartel and the Guadalajara one and responsible for most of cocaine logistics from Colombia to Mexico, was collaborating with the Contras, sending weapons, general supplies and the cocaine itself - this leads to the conclusion that the cocaine supplied to the Contras was Medellin Cartel's product.

Things began changing after the report was published as the CIA was forced to save face in the scandal. The agency blamed the cocaine smuggling to the Colombian guerrillas and explored the links between the Medellin Cartel and the left-wing organizations, making the right-wing paramilitaries in Colombia turn against the Medellin Cartel, helping forming the Los Pepes death squad. This would also allow the CIA to participate more directly in the Colombian armed conflict.

Another action from the CIA to clean its image was the removal of support for Manuel Noriega, who was prosecuted for conspiracy with drug smuggling activities between 1989 and 1990. The CIA, once one of Noriega's allies, was one of the minds back the Operation Just Cause, which effectively ended Noriega's term and led to his arrest. The end of the Panamian connection was one of the hardest hits on the Cartel operations, speeding up its decline.

Relations with Nicaraguan Government
The Carlos Lehder's Norman's Cay strategy was shut down in 1982 after the Bahamian government started chasing the drug traffic. Hence, Central America was the path chosen by the Cartel to reach the US. In 1985, the DEA, knowing about Barry Seal ties with both the Medellin Cartel, made the pilot take pictures of the cartel's landing stripes in Nicaragua. The DEA prior investigation appointed that the cartel had the protection from the FSLN, the Sandinist party, to use Nicaragua as a "warehouse" for Matta-Ballesteros' logistic operation for either Medellin and Guadalajara cartels.

Knowing Seal's activity as a DEA informant, the cartel put a contract on him, having him murdered in February 1986. In March 16 the same year, during a TV national address, the president of the United States Ronald Reagan used surveillance pictures taken on Seal's undercover mission that showed Escobar, Gacha, the Nicaraguan government official Federico Vaughan and several other men loading a plane with cocaine.

Relations with Panamanian Government
After Manuel Noriega arrest, the DEA and FBI got several tips linking the former dictator to the Medellin Cartel. The Nicaraguan and Colombian conflicts in remote areas could make both countries unsafe to operate, and the cartel was searching for new places to use as a stopover. Manuel Noriega, in exchange of bribes and share on profits, agreed using Panama as another stopover for the cartel logistics. Also, the links between him and the Cartel ensured that Panama could be a hideout for the group leadership and that the government would ignore their money laundering operations in the country.

The CIA turned a blind eye to the link between Medellin Cartel and Noriega, as he had an aggressive anticommunist policy. However, the agency stopped supporting Noriega after his ties with the Cartel came to public.

Relations with Cuban Government
During the 1980 decade, the decrease and later end of Soviet Union subsidies almost wiped out Cuban economy. During Manuel Noriega judgement, Carlos Lehder, the Cartel's responsible for ensuring that the cocaine would reach Florida, testified that, as the drug smuggling to the USA was doing billions of dollars, the Cuban intelligence helped managing Nicaraguan operations and the island's government agreed using Cuba as one of the stopovers for the Cartel. This was made with knowledge of the Castro Brothers, having the younger, Raúl, met with Lehder.

Fear of extradition
Perhaps the greatest threat posed to the Medellín Cartel and the other traffickers was the implementation of an extradition treaty between the United States and Colombia. It allowed Colombia to extradite to the US any Colombian suspected of drug trafficking and to be tried there for their crimes. This was a major problem for the cartel, since the drug traffickers had little access to their local power and influence in the US, and a trial there would most likely lead to imprisonment. Among the staunch supporters of the extradition treaty were Colombian Justice Minister Rodrigo Lara (who was pushing for more action against the drug cartels, Police Officer Jaime Ramírez, and numerous Colombian Supreme Court judges.

However, the cartel applied a "bend or break" strategy towards several of these supporters, using bribery, extortion, or violence. Nevertheless, when police efforts began to cause major losses, some of the major drug lords themselves were temporarily pushed out of Colombia, forcing them into hiding from which they ordered cartel members to take out key supporters of the extradition treaty.

The cartel issued death threats to the Supreme Court Judges, asking them to denounce the Extradition Treaty. The warnings were ignored.
This led Escobar and the group he called Los Extraditables ("The Extraditables") to start a violent campaign to pressure the Colombian government by committing a series of kidnappings, murders, and narco-terrorist actions.

Alleged relation with the M-19

In November 1985, 35 heavily armed members of the M-19 guerrilla group stormed the Colombian Supreme Court in Bogotá, leading to the Palace of Justice siege. Some claimed at the time that the cartel's influence was behind the M-19's raid, because of its interest in intimidating the Supreme Court. Others state that the alleged cartel-guerrilla relationship was unlikely to occur at the time because the two organizations had been having several standoffs and confrontations, like the kidnappings by M-19 of drug lord Carlos Lehder and of Marta Nieves Ochoa, the sister of Juan David Ochoa. These kidnappings led to the creation of the MAS/Muerte a Secuestradores ("Death to Kidnappers") paramilitary group by Pablo Escobar. Former guerrilla members have also denied that the cartel had any part in this event. The issue continues to be debated inside Colombia.

Assassinations
As a means of intimidation, the cartel conducted thousands of assassinations throughout the country. Escobar and his associates made it clear that whoever stood against them would risk being killed along with their families. Some estimates put the total around 3,500 killed during the height of the cartel's activities, including over 500 police officers in Medellín, but the entire list is impossible to assemble, due to the limitation of the judiciary power in Colombia. The following is a brief list of the most notorious assassinations conducted by the cartel:

Luis Vasco and Gilberto Hernandez, two DAS agents who had arrested Pablo Escobar in 1976. Among the earliest assassinations of authority figures by the cartel.
Rodrigo Lara, Minister of Justice, killed on a Bogotá highway on April 30, 1984, when two gunmen riding a motorcycle approached his vehicle in traffic and opened fire.
Tulio Manuel Castro Gil, Superior Judge which investigating Escobar for the assassination of two DAS agents which in 1977 arrested Escobar and his cousin Gustavo Gaviria, killed by motorcycle gunmen in July 1985, shortly after indicting Escobar.
Hernando Baquero Borda, Supreme Court Justice; rapporteur and defender of the Extradition Treaty with the United States, killed by gunmen in Bogotá on July 31, 1986.
Jaime Ramírez Gómez, Police Colonel and head of the anti-narcotics unit of the National Police of Colombia. Killed near Fontibon on his way to Bogota on November 17, 1986, when assassins in a green Renault 18 beside his red Mitsubishi Montero and opened fire. Ramírez was killed instantly; his wife and two sons were unharmed 
Guillermo Cano Isaza, director of El Espectador who revealed publicly Escobar's criminal past, killed on  December 17, 1986, in Bogotá by gunmen riding a motorcycle.
Jaime Pardo Leal, presidential candidate and head of the Patriotic Union party, killed by a gunman in October 1987.
Carlos Mauro Hoyos, Attorney General, kidnapped then killed by gunmen in Medellín in January 1988.
Antonio Roldan Betancur, governor of Antioquia, killed by a car bomb in July 1989.
Waldemar Franklin Quintero, Commander of the Antioquia police, killed by gunmen in Medellín in August 1989.
Luis Carlos Galán, presidential candidate, killed by gunmen during a rally in Soacha in August 1989. The assassination was carried out on the same day the commander of the Antioquia police was gunned down by the cartel.
Carlos Ernesto Valencia, Superior Judge, killed by gunmen shortly after indicting Escobar on the death of Guillermo Cano, in August 1989.
Jorge Enrique Pulido, journalist, director of Jorge Enrique Pulido TV, killed by gunmen in Bogotá in November 1989.
Diana Turbay, journalist, chief editor of the Hoy por Hoy magazine and former president Julio César Turbay Ayala's daughter, killed by Colombian military during a rescue attempt in January 1991. Actually, the bullet found in her body came from a police helicopter.
Enrique Low Murtra, Minister of Justice, killed by gunmen in downtown Bogotá in May 1991.
Myriam Rocio Velez, Superior Judge, killed by gunmen shortly before she was to sentence Escobar on the assassination of Galán, in September 1992.

Miguel Maza Márquez was targeted in the DAS Building Bombing, resulting in the death of 52 civilians caught in the blast. Miguel escaped unharmed.

In 1993, shortly before Escobar's death, the cartel lieutenants were also targeted by the vigilante group Los Pepes (or PEPES, People Persecuted by Pablo Escobar).

With the assassination of Juan Diego Arcila Henao in 2007, most if not all of Escobar's lieutenants who were not in prison had been killed by the Colombian National Police Search Bloc (trained and assisted by U.S. Delta Force and CIA operatives), or by the Los Pepes vigilantes.

DEA agents considered that their four-pronged "Kingpin Strategy", specifically targeting senior cartel figures, was a major contributing factor to the collapse of the organization.

Legacy
La Oficina de Envigado is believed to be a partial successor to the Medellín organization. It was founded by Don Berna as an enforcement wing for the Medellín Cartel. When Don Berna fell out with Escobar, La Oficina caused Escobar's rivals to oust Escobar. The organization then inherited the Medellín turf and its criminal connections in the US, Mexico, and the UK, and began to affiliate with the paramilitary United Self-Defense Forces of Colombia, organizing drug trafficking operations on their behalf.

In popular culture
The cartel has been both featured and referenced in numerous works of popular culture.
 Kings of Cocaine: Inside the Medellín Cartel - An Astonishing True Story of Murder, Money and International Corruption, Book by Guy Gugliotta
 Blow: 2001 film about drug smuggler George Jung, Carlos Lehder (named Diego Delgado  in the film) and the Medellín Cartel
 Narcos is a Netflix original television series (2015–2017) that chronicles the life of Pablo Escobar and the rise of the Medellín Cartel. The first and second season depict his rise to the status of a powerful drug lord as well his narcoterrorist acts, war against the Colombian government and finally, his death. The role of Escobar is played by Brazilian actor Wagner Moura. The Medellín organization is also briefly depicted and mentioned in the spinoff series Narcos: Mexico.
 Cocaine Cowboys and Cocaine Cowboys 2: documentary series about the Miami Drug War and Griselda Blanco
 American Desperado: a book by journalist Evan Wright and former Medellín Cartel trafficker Jon Roberts
 The Two Escobars: an ESPN 30 for 30 film details the link between the Medellín Cartel and the rise of Colombian football
 American Made: 2017 fictionalised film about drug smuggler Barry Seal (Tom Cruise) and the Medellín Cartel, led by Jorge Ochoa (Alejandro Edda)
 Season 2 episode 7 of Deadliest Warrior pitted the Medellín Cartel against the Somali Pirates with Michael Corleone Blanco, Son Of Griselda Blanco and gangster turned informant Kenny "Kenji" Gallo testing the cartel's weapons.

See also

Colombian Conflict
Drug barons of Colombia
Miami Drug War
Narcoterrorism
Narcotrafficking in Colombia
Tranquilandia
Juan Matta-Ballesteros
Max Mermelstein
Mickey Munday
Jack Carlton Reed
Jon Roberts
Virginia Vallejo

References

Further reading
  A book that details the efforts by the governments of the United States and Colombia, their respective military and intelligence forces, and Los Pepes (controlled by the Cali cartel) to stop illegal activities committed by Colombian drug lord Pablo Escobar and his subordinates. It relates how Escobar was killed and his cartel dismantled.

External links 
 

Organizations established in 1972
1972 establishments in Colombia
Organizations disestablished in 1993
1993 disestablishments in Colombia
 
Disbanded Colombian drug cartels
Medellín
Terrorism in Colombia
Transnational organized crime
Organized crime groups in the United States
Gangs in Florida
Former gangs in New York City
Organised crime groups in Spain
Pablo Escobar